At the 1964 Summer Olympics, fourteen different artistic gymnastics events were contested, eight for men and six for women.  All events were held at the Tokyo Metropolitan Gymnasium in Tokyo from 18 October through 23 October.

The scoring in all the events was the same, as for gymnastics events at the previous Olympics. The six best gymnasts on the apparatus in the team competition (by sum of two scores - for compulsory and optional routine) qualified for that apparatus finals. Each of the women's events was judged by five judges. The highest and lowest marks were dropped and an average of three remaining ones constituted the score. Each of the men's events were judged by four judges. The highest and lowest marks were dropped and an average of two remaining ones constituted the score.

Results

Men's events

Women's

Medal table

References

External links

 Official Olympic Report
 www.gymnasticsresults.com
 www.gymn-forum.net

 
1964
1964 Summer Olympics events
1964 in gymnastics